The Complete Stories of Franz Kafka is a compilation of all of Kafka's short stories. With the exception of three novels (The Trial, The Castle and Amerika), this collection includes all of his narrative work. The book was originally edited by Nahum N. Glatzer and published by Schocken Books in 1971. It was reprinted in 1995 with an introduction by John Updike.

The collection includes all the works published during Kafka's lifetime, with the exception of The Stoker which is usually incorporated as the first chapter of his unfinished novel Amerika. Some of the stories included in the book are fragmented or in various states of incompletion. Most of the stories are translated by Willa and Edwin Muir, with occasional translations by Tania and James Stern.

Several fables, parables and philosophical pieces are not included in this collection, as they were never meant to be independent stories or never intended for publication. These can be found in Kafka's diaries, notebooks and letters.

Contents

Foreword by John Updike (1995 edition only)

Two Introductory Parables
 "Before the Law" from the ninth chapter of the novel The Trial 
 "An Imperial Message" from the short story "The Great Wall of China"

The Longer Stories

 Description of a Struggle
 Wedding Preparations in the Country
 The Judgment
 The Metamorphosis
 In the Penal Colony
 The Village Schoolmaster (The Giant Mole)
 Blumfeld, an Elderly Bachelor
 The Warden of the Tomb
 A Country Doctor

 The Hunter Gracchus + fragment
 The Great Wall of China + fragment
 A Report to an Academy + two fragments
 The Refusal
 A Hunger Artist
 Investigations of a Dog
 A Little Woman
 The Burrow
 Josephine the Singer, or The Mouse Folk

The Shorter Stories

 Children on a Country Road
 The Trees
 Clothes
 Excursion into the Mountains
 The Rejection
 The Street Window
 The Tradesman
 Absent-minded Window-gazing
 The Way Home
 Passers-by
 On the Tram
 Reflections for Gentlemen-Jockeys
 The Wish to be a Red Indian
 Unhappiness
 Bachelor's Ill Luck
 Unmasking a Confidence Trickster
 The Sudden Walk
 Resolutions
 A Dream
 Up in the Gallery
 A Fratricide
 The Next Village
 A Visit to a Mine
 Jackals and Arabs
 The Bridge
 The Bucket Rider
 The New Advocate
 An Old Manuscript

 The Knock at the Manor Gate
 Eleven Sons
My Neighbor
A Crossbreed
The Cares of a Family Man
A Common Confusion
The Truth about Sancho Panza
The Silence of the Sirens
Prometheus
The City Coat of Arms
Poseidon
Fellowship
At Night
The Problem of Our Laws
The Conscription of Troops
The Test
The Vulture
The Helmsman
The Top
A Little Fable
Home-Coming
First Sorrow
The Departure
Advocates
The Married Couple
Give it Up!
On Parables

Postscript

By Nahum N. Glatzer

Bibliography
 Kafka's stories and collections of stories published during his lifetime
 Kafka's works published after his death
 Collected works in German
 Schocken editions of Kafka's works in English
 Other editions of Kafka's works in English
 Supplement

Editors and Translators

On the material included in this volume
Notes on the writing and publication history of the stories and fragments.

Chronology
Chronology of Kafka's life and writing.

Selected writings on Kafka
A list of critical and biographical essays on Kafka.

Notes
 The first eighteen of "The Shorter Stories" are usually grouped under the title Contemplation (Betrachtung), or Meditation .

Editions

 Kafka, Franz (ed. Nahum N. Glatzer). The Complete Stories. New York: Schocken Books, 1971 (Hardcover) , 1988 (Paperback)  
 Kafka, Franz (ed. Nahum N. Glatzer). The Complete Stories. New York: Schocken Books, 1995. With a foreword by John Updike  (Paperback)

Short story collections by Franz Kafka
Translations into English
Kafka, Franz
Schocken Books books